Jonathan Frederick Togo (born August 25, 1977) is an American actor, best known for his role in CSI: Miami as Ryan Wolfe.

Early life, family and education
Togo was born in Rockland, Massachusetts, the son of Sheila, a housewife and former visual merchandiser and Michael Togo, a commercial artist and graphic designer who previously worked for the Boston Globe. Sheila Togo runs Simply Sheila, a booth at the SoWa Open Market in Boston.

Togo's mother is of Italian and Irish descent and his father is Jewish; the original surname, Tonkaviev, shortened by a forefather who wanted something snappier for his carpet business.

He attended Hebrew school as a child and graduated from Rockland High School in 1995, where he was a wrestler. He attended the Project Contemporary Competitiveness, Advanced Study Program (a.k.a. PCC ASP) as a student in 1991 and 1992, then worked as a proctor in 1996.

He attended Vassar College, graduating with a B.A. in theater. He studied at the National Theater Institute of the Eugene O’Neill Theater.

While at Vassar, Togo was classmates with future Bravery singer/songwriter Sam Endicott and keyboardist John Conway.  The three played in various bands together in the Poughkeepsie area.

Career
Togo has performed and participated in numerous plays, including Our Country's Good. While he is most famous for his role as Ryan Wolfe in CSI: Miami, he has other TV show credits including a starring role in Special Unit 2, as well as appearances in Judging Amy. He also played a store clerk in Mystic River.

In 2008, Togo wrote and directed a web series, My Best Friend Is My Penis for Atom.com.

Togo also starred in a web series called "Casted: The Continuing Chronicles of Derek Riffchyn, Greatest Casting Director in the World. Ever", where he plays the lead role of Derek: a sassy, somewhat abusive, and extremely crass casting director. Togo's real-life best friend Justin Long plays his assistant, Scott. In 2010, he signed on to play twin brothers Richard and Mark (who fall in love with the same woman), in the movie Identical.

In September 2013, it was announced that Togo would be part of the cast in the fourth season of Covert Affairs.

Personal life
Togo was married to actress Diora Baird from 2013 to 2016. The couple have one child, a son. He married actress Tiffany Baker (known for Birds Court from 2015 and The Cat's Meow from 2018) on January 17, 2019. In March 2021, Baker gave birth to their first child, a daughter.

Filmography

References

External links
 
 Jonathan Togo Bio at CBS

1977 births
Living people
Male actors from Massachusetts
People from Rockland, Massachusetts
American male film actors
American people of Irish descent
American people of Italian descent
American people of Jewish descent
American male stage actors
American male television actors
Vassar College alumni